The European Federation of Sports Medicine Associations or EFSMA is the main Europe-wide sports medicine organization.

History
Sports medicine, internationally, is represented by the Fédération Internationale de Medicine Sportive. It was founded in Portugal at a congress of the FIMS.

Structure
It is headquartered at the Maison du Sport International in Lausanne. There is also the European College of Sports and Exercise Physicians.

Function
Its official journal is the European Journal of Sports Medicine.

See also
 British Journal of Sports Medicine (BJSM)
 European Academy of Sciences and Arts
 American College of Sports Medicine

References

External links
 EFSMA
 EFSMA 2017

European sports federations
International sports bodies based in Switzerland
International sports organizations
International medical associations of Europe
Sports medicine organizations
Medical and health organisations based in Switzerland
Organisations based in Lausanne
Scientific organizations established in 1997
Sports organizations established in 1997